Inquilinus limosus is a bacterium first isolated from cystic fibrosis patients' lungs, and is rarely observed elsewhere, prompting extensive research into its biology.

References

Further reading

Davies, Jane C., and Bruce K. Rubin. "Emerging and unusual gram-negative infections in cystic fibrosis." Seminars in respiratory and critical care medicine. Vol. 28. No. 03. Copyright© 2007 by Thieme Medical Publishers, Inc., 333 Seventh Avenue, New York, NY 10001, USA., 2007.

External links

LPSN
Type strain of Inquilinus limosus at BacDive -  the Bacterial Diversity Metadatabase

Rhodospirillales